Gustav Adolf Bauer (6 January 1870 – 16 September 1944) was a German Social Democratic Party leader and the chancellor of Germany from June 1919 to March 1920. He served as head of government for nine months. Prior to becoming head of government, Bauer had been Minister of Labour in the first democratically elected German cabinet. After his cabinet was brought down by the Kapp Putsch in March 1920, Bauer served as vice-chancellor, Minister of the Treasury, and Minister of Transportation in other cabinets of the Weimar Republic from May 1920 to November 1922. In 1924 and 1925 he was involved in the Barmat scandal.

Early life
Bauer was born on 6 January 1870 in Darkehmen, near Königsberg in East Prussia (now Ozyorsk, Kaliningrad Oblast, Russia) as the son of bailiff Gustav Bauer and his wife Henriette (née Groß). From 1876 to 1884, he attended the Volksschule in Königsberg. After 1884, he worked as a clerk and later head clerk for a lawyer at Königsberg.

In 1895, he became president of the Union of Office Employees of Germany, a white-collar union that he co-founded. He also was editor of the publication Der Büroangestellte ("The Office Worker") and in 1903 was named head of the Zentral-Arbeiter-Sekretariat der Freien Gewerkschaften in Berlin ("Central Secretary of Independent Unions"). In 1908, Bauer became second chairman of the Generalkommission der Gewerkschaften (General Commission of Trade Unions) in Berlin, a position he kept until 1918.

On 2 October 1911, Bauer married Hedwig Moch.

Political career

Imperial Germany and revolutionary period
In 1912, Bauer was elected to the Reichstag for the Social Democratic Party of Germany (SPD) in a Breslau constituency. In October 1918, Bauer became Secretary of State at the Reichsarbeitsamt (Labour) in Max von Baden's cabinet. Bauer remained in this position throughout the revolution of 1918/19. After Max von Baden resigned in November 1918, Bauer continued to serve under Reichskanzler Friedrich Ebert and then under the Council of the People's Deputies, also headed by Ebert. While serving as Minister of Labour, Bauer introduced the Factory Constitution Law and issued a number of decrees, including universal voting rights for those aged 20 and above in all types of elections, regulated wage agreements, protection from arbitrary dismissal with appeal as a right, the re-instalment of demobilised workers, a national health insurance, local municipality social welfare (split between the states and government), the right of civil-service associations, agricultural labour reform, domestic labour reforms, and the eight-hour workday.

Weimar Republic
In January 1919, Bauer was elected to the National Assembly for Magdeburg. In February, he became Minister of Labour in Philipp Scheidemann's cabinet. After Scheidemann resigned in June 1919 as a protest against the Treaty of Versailles, Bauer succeeded him as Reichsministerpräsident, heading the Bauer cabinet. His government signed the Treaty. When the Weimar Constitution came into force in August 1919, Bauer became Reichskanzler (Chancellor). Bauer's time as Chancellor witnessed the passage of the Reich Settlement Law of August 1919, which redistributed large estates among smaller farmers, although only 3% of small-scale farmers had benefitted from this law by 1928. The Allotment Garden and Small-Lease-Holding Ordinance of July 1919 provided legal protection for non-commercially used property such as workers' gardens and "Schreber" gardens. In October 1919, a law came into force that entitled insured women to a lump sum of 50 marks from their insurance board to cover the cost of childbirth, together with confinement compensation for 10 weeks. In addition, maternity care was covered by a 25 mark payment and a daily breastfeeding bonus of one mark fifty for 10 weeks. This law also entitled the wives and daughters of insured employees (both female and male) to certain types of support in connection with pregnancy. Following a similar decree issued in December 1918, an important decree was issued in support of Jugendpflege (youth welfare) in November 1919.

Various improvements to unemployment benefits were also carried out during Bauer's time as chancellor. A winter supplement was provided in October 1919, and certain modifications were carried out in January 1920. In addition, the maximum benefit for single males over the age of 21 was increased from three and a half to six marks in February 1920. A decree of October 1919, however, ordered all Reich unemployment relief funds to be withdrawn from those municipal authorities that went beyond the maximum scales.

In the field of sickness insurance, a decree of 28 June 1919 bestowed upon rural funds the same right of self-government that other funds had. An order of 27 October 1919 empowered the Reich Minister of Labour to encourage through grants and loans "measures which were estimated to create opportunities for employment". In December 1919, laws were passed that extended compulsory insurance against infirmity and old age to certain new classes of workpeople. The Betriebsrätegesetz (Factory Council Act) of February 1920 established works councils at workplaces with 20 or more on the payroll as a means of improving lines of communication between labour and management. In addition, a series of progressive tax reforms were implemented under the auspices of finance minister Matthias Erzberger, such as the Reich Revenue Law of July 1919, which gave the Reich sole authority for levying and administering taxes, the levying of war taxes on income and wealth as well as inheritance taxation in July 1919, and a one-off wealth tax in December 1919.

In March 1920, the Kapp-Lüttwitz Putsch attempted to depose the government. Bauer, along with other SPD members of the cabinet and president Ebert, signed a call for a general strike against the putsch. Most of the cabinet left Berlin for Dresden, then Stuttgart. However, some ministers remained in the capital and, led by vice-chancellor Eugen Schiffer negotiated with the putschists. Once the putsch had collapsed, the Bauer government was forced to resign on 27 March—mostly as a result of the negotiations conducted with Kapp and his fellow conspirators. Bauer was succeeded as chancellor by Hermann Müller (also SPD).

However, Bauer joined the new cabinet as Minister of the Treasury, a position he held until June 1920. From May to June 1920, Bauer was also Minister of Transportation. In the Reichstag elections of June 1920, he was reelected to parliament. However, the new government formed on 25 June excluded the SPD.

Bauer rejoined the cabinet of Joseph Wirth in May 1921 as Minister of the Treasury and vice-chancellor. He held those positions throughout the term of office of Wirth (until November 1922). Throughout this time, Bauer was also a member of the Reichstag for Magdeburg and he retained his seat after leaving the government. However, in November 1924 he became involved in the Barmat scandal due to a personal relationship with the accused, Julius Barmat. On 7 February 1925, he was forced by the SPD parliamentary group to relinquish his seat in the Reichstag and on 14 February was expelled from the party.

Yet on 14 May 1926, Bauer's expulsion was overturned by the party. He returned to the Reichstag until 1928, when he left parliament and retired from public life.

Later life
After the Nazi party took power in 1933, Bauer was arrested on 29 June 1933. He was supposed to have misappropriated public funds. However, the charge was based on alleged statements made by his son in school. When it turned out that Bauer's marriage was childless and there was in fact no son, he was released after a week of custody. The lawsuit was dismissed only in 1935, however.

Bauer died in Hersdorf (Berlin Reinickendorf) on 16 September 1944.

Literature
 Braun, Bernd: Die Reichskanzler der Weimarer Republik. Zwölf Lebensläufe in Bildern. Droste, Düsseldorf 2011, p. 100 – 133. .
 
 Rintelen, Karlludwig: Ein undemokratischer Demokrat: Gustav Bauer. Gewerkschaftsführer – Freund Friedrich Eberts – Reichskanzler. Eine politische Biographie, Lang, Frankfurt/M. 1993,  (the only biography of Gustav Bauers and a very critical account)
 Voigt, Martin: "Gustav Adolf Bauer". p. 177–190. In: Wilhelm v. Sternburg (Hrsg.): Die deutschen Kanzler. Von Bismarck bis Schmidt. Königstein/Taunus: Athenäum 1985. .

References

External links

 

1870 births
1944 deaths
20th-century Chancellors of Germany
People from East Prussia
People from the Province of Prussia
Social Democratic Party of Germany politicians
Chancellors of Germany
Vice-Chancellors of Germany
Labor ministers (Germany)
Transport ministers of Germany
Federal government ministers of Germany
Members of the 13th Reichstag of the German Empire
Members of the Weimar National Assembly
Members of the Reichstag of the Weimar Republic
Prussian politicians